Vila Parisi is a "favela" (slum) in Cubatão, Brazil, that was the site of a major industrial oil spill fire on February 25, 1984. 700,000 liters of gas were released, 1,000 homes were destroyed, and 100 people died. The geography of Cubatão prevented rapid dispersal of air pollutants released from the burning fuels. The German sociologist Ulrich Beck used the case of Vila Parisi ("The dirtiest chemical town in the world") as an example of the "destructive powers of the developed risk industry."

References

Further reading 
 

Favelas
Environmental disasters in South America
Neighbourhoods in São Paulo (state)
Man-made disasters in Brazil
Cubatão